The Dewoitine P-3 was a glider designed by Emile Dewoitine and built by Constructions Aéronautiques Émile Dewoitine in the early 1920s.

Designa and development
The P-3 was an early glider from France, built almost exclusively fromwood with fabric covering those parts not skinned in ply veneer. The airframe was simple with rectangular section fuselage, one-piece wing sat on top, an all flying tailplane for pitch control with a rectangular fin and large rudder. The undercarriage consisted of a tail-skid and two mainwheels partially housed in the fuselage on both sides. The pilot sat in an open cockpit at the forward part of the wing centre-section, with an opening in the wing skin for his/her head.

Operational history
Two P-3 gliders were purchased for Czechoslovakia in 1923, taking part in national meets and competitions.

Specifications

References

External links
 Planeurs.net Dewoitine P-3

P-3
1920s French sailplanes
Aircraft first flown in 1923
Glider aircraft